Hamilton Sheriff Court is a judicial building in Almada Street, Hamilton, South Lanarkshire, Scotland. The building, which continues to serve as the local courthouse, is a Category A listed building.

History
The first judicial building in Hamilton, which contained a council chamber, a courthouse and a jail, was built adjoining the old tolbooth at the junction of Castle Street and Palace Grounds Road and was completed in 1798. By the 1830s, the tolbooth complex was very dilapidated and it was decided that "soon all be removed, except the steeple, town clock, and bell."

The foundation stone for a new courthouse was laid on 10 June 1834. It was designed in the neoclassical style, built in ashlar stone and was completed later that year. The original design involved a symmetrical main frontage of seven bays facing onto Almada Steet. The central section of the three bays featured a full height tetrastyle portico formed by Ionic order columns supporting a frieze, an entablature and a pediment. There were two-bay wings on either side fenestrated by sash windows. Internally, the principal rooms were the main courtroom, in the centre of the building on the ground floor, and a large hall on the first floor, which was established for county meetings. A jail building was also established to the north of the courthouse.

The courthouse was re-modelled to a design by John Lamb Murray in 1886. The works included single-bay extensions, which were slightly projected forward, at either end on the Almada Street frontage. The new bays were fenestrated by sash windows, with architraves and cornices; these windows were flanked by full-height Doric order pilasters supporting friezes, entablatures and cornices. The jail building was demolished, creating space for a long extension along Beckford Street, consisting of a nine-bay central section, which featured another full-height tetrastyle portico, short recessed connecting sections, and three bay wings, all designed by Murray.

The complex continued to serve as the local sheriff court throughout the 20th century and into the 21st century. However, a new building known as Birnie House in Caird Street, was acquired in 2006 to deal with civil and family cases, allowing the Almada Street / Beckford Street building to focus on criminal cases. It remains the third busiest courthouse in Scotland after Edinburgh and Glasgow.

The court scenes for series 6 of the BBC sitcom Still Game were filmed in the courthouse in 2007.

See also
 List of Category A listed buildings in South Lanarkshire
 List of listed buildings in Hamilton, South Lanarkshire

Notes

References

External links

Government buildings completed in 1834
Category A listed buildings in South Lanarkshire
Court buildings in Scotland
Buildings and structures in Hamilton, South Lanarkshire